Christopher Willits (born April 8, 1978) is a San Francisco-based guitarist, electronic music composer and producer, visual artist and scholar. His music is electroacoustic in nature, in that both analogue and digital sounds are meshed into one singular sound.

Biography
Born in Kansas City, MO, Willits began playing guitar when he was about 13. He got his first guitar after a football game when, out of the blue, his father suggested they buy one for him. He'd played piano as a child, but up to this point, his main interest had been sports. "I couldn't really stand piano. It felt too boxy and classical," he remembers. "I loved that dynamic energy of sports and the improvisation... I played everything; soccer, baseball, basketball. ... That's really where my understanding of improvisation and teamwork came in."

With his own guitar, he began playing all the time, trying to figure out the solos that he heard on his Jimi Hendrix records, and then forming bands in the psychedelic vein. Also a visual artist, he attended the Kansas City Art Institute, where he studied painting, then came to Mills College in California where he studied with Fred Frith and Pauline Oliveros. An ambient album released while still in college on Taylor Dupree's 12K label launched his solo career.

“A universal talent, not only a virtuosic musician but an adept computer programmer—to create his shimmering walls of sound he uses his own custom software (he began inventing his own guitar effects when he was 13), and accompanies live performances with interactive visuals.”

The Kansas City native came to the Bay Area in 2000 (After a painting scholarship at KCAI)and received a master's degree in electronic music at Mills College where he studied with Fred Frith and Pauline Oliveros. Along the way, he advanced his skills in photography, cinematography and new media.

Willits completed a master's degree in electronic music at Mills College.

Willits, as a solo artist or in collaboration, has released music on the following record labels: 12k (USA), Ghostly International (USA), Fällt(Ireland), Sub Rosa (Belgium), Ache Records (Canada), Yacca (Japan) and Plop (Japan). He has toured throughout Europe, America, Mexico, Canada, Australia, China, Thailand, and Japan.

Willits has participated in numerous projects, including collaborations with Ryuichi Sakamoto, Tycho, Zach Hill (drummer from the band Death Grips and Hella), Kid606, Brad Laner (Medicine), Nate Boyce, Latrice Barnett (singer/songwriter and bassist for Handsome Boy Modeling School), Taylor Deupree (12k record label founder), Scott Pagano (visual artist and motion graphics designer), Matmos. Willits is also the founder and director of the record label and community building organization Overlap.

Education 
Willits regularly teaches workshops on spatial audio, music production, the creative process, and leadership. He has taught at California College of the Arts (CCA), San Francisco Art Institute (SFAI), Berkeley City College (BCC), The Art Institute San Francisco, Norcal DJMPA, Sound Arts, the Bay Area Video Coalition and Goucher College.

Willits is also a meditation teacher teaching at The Center (cite ), Habitas, Envelop SF, and his own private workshops.

Instruments and Tools 
Willits plays a custom Moog guitar. Along with various outboard gear and uses Ableton Live with Max for Live, and Touch Designer for video processing.

Envelop 
Willits is the executive director of Envelop, a nonprofit organization that amplifies the connective power of music through immersive audio venues, and open source spatial audio production software.

Overlap 
Christopher Willits directs the creative collective http://overlap.org  which is involved in creative community building events and runs a studio in Oakland CA.

Folding
Willits' guitar lines and harmonies are folded into each other using custom-designed software (Willits uses the term "folding" to describe the non-linear, real-time indexing, cutting and re-sampling of guitar and voice).

Willits, in an interview, further expanded on the term 'folding,' "It has a lot to do with time. I actually wrote a whole thesis about this, if you want to go to the Mills library and check it out [laughs]. It's a very simple process of recording something to memory and then indexing at different points. But instead of it being a granular process [a form of synthesis in which a sample is separated into 'grains'], I'm actually skating to different locations within this memory. So there's this continuous rupture of time that creates these rhythmic patterns, so these melodic patterns start to emerge out of this time processing technique."

Discography
Gravity (Ghostly International) - 2022
Sunset (Ghostly International) - 2019
Horizon (Ghostly International) - 2017
The Art of Listening (An Original Score Soundtrack) (self-released) - 2014
Opening (Ghostly International) – 2014
Ancient Future (Ghostly International) - 2012
GOLD (Overlap) – 2011
Live on Earth – Vol. 3 (self-released) – 2011
Tiger Flower Circle Sun (Ghostly International) – 2010
Live on Earth – Vol. 2 (self-released) – 2009
Live on Earth – Vol. 1 (self-released) – 2009
Plants and Hearts (Room40) – 2007
Surf Boundaries (Ghostly International) – 2006
Pollen (Fallt) – 2003
Little Edo (Nibble) – 2003
Folding, and the Tea (12k) – 2002
:plateaus, centers, stoma... (self-released CDR) – 2001
storks and wires (self-released CDR) – 2000

Collaborations and band projects
Willits + Sakamoto (Christopher Willits and Ryuichi Sakamoto) – Ancient Future (Ghostly International) – 2012
Boyce + Matmos + Willits - Subconscious Attraction Strategies (2011)
Willits + Sakamoto (Christopher Willits and Ryuichi Sakamoto) – Ocean Fire (Commmons/12k) – 2008
Christopher Willits + Taylor Deupree – Listening Garden (Line) – 2007
The North Valley Subconscious Orchestra – The Right Kind of Nothing (Ghostly International) – 2006
Christopher Willits + Taylor Deupree – Live in Japan 2004 (12k) – 2005
Flössin – Lead Singer (Ache Records, Yacca) – 2004
Christopher Willits + Taylor Deupree – Mujo (Plop) – 2004
Christopher Willits + Taylor Deupree – AS08 (Sub Rosa, Audiosphere) – 2003
Saturn 138 (HWTBL) – 1998

Remixes 

 Tycho - Montana (Christopher Willits Remix)
 The Glitch Mob - The Clouds Breathe for You (Christopher Willits Remix)
 Harold Budd - Olancha Hello (Christopher Willits Remix)
 Alejandro Bento - Heartbeat (Christopher Willits Remix)
 Clarinet Factory - Nautilus (Christopher Willits Remix)
 Tmymtur - 050912/0 (Christopher Willits Remix)

Compilations 

 Various artists – Idol Tryouts (Ghostly International) – 2006
 Various artists – SMM vol.2 – Breathe in Seven Sections (Ghostly International) – 2004
 Various artists – E*A*D*G*B*E – Seven Machines For Summer (12k) – 2003

References

External links
 Christopher Willits official website
 MikeyPod Podcast interview with Christopher Willits (2008)
 MikeyPod Podcast interview with Christopher Willits (2017)

Living people
American electronic musicians
American experimental musicians
Artists from Missouri
Musicians from Kansas City, Missouri
Ableton Live users
Kansas City Art Institute alumni
Place of birth missing (living people)
Guitarists from Missouri
American male guitarists
1978 births